S-segment cars are a European car segment class for sports coupés. The equivalent Euro NCAP class is called "roadster sport".

Characteristics 
S-segment cars have a sporting appearance and are usually designed to have superior handling and/or straight-line acceleration compared to other segments. The most common body styles for S-segment cars are coupé and convertible. Rear passenger accommodation is not a priority for S-segment cars, therefore many models are either two-seat cars or have a 2+2 layout with relatively cramped rear seating.

Most recent S-segment cars use the commonplace front-engine design (as either an FF layout, FR layout or F4 layout), however the majority of cars with a Mid-engine design or rear-engine design belong to the S-segment.

Current models 
The five highest selling S-segment cars in Europe are the Mazda MX-5, Porsche 911, Ford Mustang and Porsche Boxster/Cayman.

European sales figures 

In 2014, the five highest selling coupé models were the BMW 4 Series, Opel Astra GTC, BMW 2 Series, Renault Mégane Coupé and Mercedes-Benz C-Class (W204). The five highest selling convertible models in 2014 were the Fiat 500C, Mini Hatch, BMW 4 Series (F32), Volkswagen Beetle (A5) and Volkswagen Golf Mk6.

See also 

 Euro Car Segment
 Car classifications
 Coupé
 Convertible
 Grand tourer
 Muscle car
 Sports car
 Supercar

References 

Euro car segments